The concept of nurture kinship in the anthropological study of human social relationships (kinship) highlights the extent to which such relationships are brought into being through the performance of various acts of nurture between individuals. Additionally the concept highlights ethnographic findings that, in a wide swath of human societies, people understand, conceptualize and symbolize their relationships predominantly in terms of giving, receiving and sharing nurture. The concept stands in contrast to the earlier anthropological concepts of human kinship relations being fundamentally based on "blood ties", some other form of shared substance, or a proxy for these (as in fictive kinship), and the accompanying notion that people universally understand their social relationships predominantly in these terms.

The nurture kinship perspective on the ontology of social ties, and how people conceptualize them, has become stronger in the wake of David M. Schneider's influential Critique of the Study of Kinship and Holland's subsequent Social Bonding and Nurture Kinship, demonstrating that as well as the ethnographic record, biological theory and evidence also more strongly support the nurture perspective than the blood perspective (see Human inclusive fitness). Both Schneider and Holland argue that the earlier blood theory of kinship derived from an unwarranted extension of symbols and values from anthropologists' own cultures (see ethnocentrism).

Intellectual background
Reports of kinship ties being based on various forms of shared nurture date back at least to William Robertson Smith's (1889) compiled Lectures on The Religion of the Semites:

At this stage, Robertson Smith interpreted the kinship ties emerging from the sharing of food as constituting an alternative form of the sharing of substance, aside from the sharing of blood or genetic substance which many anthropologists (e.g. Lewis H. Morgan) assumed was the 'natural basis' of social ties. However, later observations focused on the nurturing qualities of food-sharing behavior, allowing a potential distinction between the earlier emphasis on kinship as shared substance (e.g. food or blood) and kinship as performance (of care-giving or nurturing behaviors):

Sometimes the line between conceiving of kinship as substance or as nurture is blurred by using both concepts. For example, the substance of food or milk may be conceived as the medium or vehicle through which the nurturing behavior is performed (e.g. Strathern 1973). The notion that it is the nurturing acts themselves that create social ties between people has developed most noticeably since the 1970s:

The term "nurture kinship" may have been first used in the present context by Watson (1983), who contrasted it with "nature kinship" (kinship concepts built upon shared substance of some kind). Since the 1970s, an increasing number of ethnographies have documented the extent to which social ties in various cultures can be understood to be built upon nurturant acts.

Ethnographic examples
Marshall on the Trukese (now known as the Chuukese) of Micronesia:

Gow on the Piro of Amazonia:

Thomas on the Temanambondro of Madagascar:

Storrie on the Hoti of Venezuelan Guiana:

Viegas on a Bahian Amerindian Community in Brazil:

Link with attachment theory

It can be seen from the ethnographies that several anthropologists have found that describing social ties in terms of emotional attachments is appropriate. This has prompted some to suggest that an inter-disciplinary collaboration might be useful:

Within the discipline of psychology, the formation of social and emotional ties are treated by attachment theory. Drawing on animal studies from the 1950s onwards, John Bowlby and colleagues described how—for all primates, including humans—the reliable provision of nurture and care leads to strong bonds of attachment between the carer and cared-for.

Following the nurture kinship approach thus allows a synthesis between the extensive cross-cultural data of ethnographers and the long-standing findings of psychology on the nature of human bonding and emotional ties.

Link with evolutionary biology

David Schneider suspected that the traditional anthropological models of blood kinship were not mirrored by the "scientific facts of biology".

Holland subsequently showed that Schneider's intuition in regard to the 'scientific facts' was correct. In evolutionary biology, the theory treating the evolution of social cooperation emerged in a formal version in the 1960s and 1970s in the form of inclusive fitness theory, and a related theory, kin selection. The theory specifies that one criterion for the evolution of certain kinds of social traits is a statistical association of identical genes, as would exist when close genetic relatives associate with one another. Early applications of the theory applied to humans (darwinian anthropology) took as their starting position the former anthropological perspective that human kinship is fundamentally "based on" blood-ties. However, these extensions emerged at precisely the time that anthropology was reflexively critiquing this "blood" assumption behind traditional kinship theorizing. This reversion to "blood" led some anthropologists to strongly attack the emerging biological perspectives as suffering the same ethnocentric assumptions (e.g., "blood is thicker than water") that the anthropologists themselves had recently eschewed.

This clash of perspectives led to something of a stand-off and a lack of communication between the disciplines, resulting in little cooperation and progress for three decades. The stand-off was resolved by Holland's Social Bonding and Nurture Kinship which re-visited biological inclusive fitness theory to draw a distinction between the statistical evolutionary mechanisms for the emergence of social traits and the non-deterministic proximate mechanisms through which they are expressed. In a strict interpretation of the theory, a statistical association of related genes (as would be present in the interactions of close genetic relatives) is understood as a necessary (though not sufficient) condition for the evolutionary emergence of certain traits relating to social cooperation (see kin selection). However, this does not entail that the proximate mechanisms governing the expression of such social traits in primates and humans necessarily depends on (or are determined by) conditions of genetic relatedness per se. For the vast majority of social mammals—including primates and humans—the formation of social bonds (and the resulting social cooperation) are based on familiarity from an early developmental stage, and the same kinds of mechanisms that attachment theorists (see above) have outlined. In short, in humans and in other primates, genetic relatedness is not necessary for the attachment bonds to develop, and it is the performance of nurture that underlies such bonds and the enduring social cooperation that typically accompanies them (see Social Bonding and Nurture Kinship).
Therefore, the nurture kinship perspective leads to the synthesis of evolutionary biology, psychology, and socio-cultural anthropology on the topic of social bonding and cooperation, without reductionism or positing a deterministic role to genes or genetic relatedness in the mechanisms through which social behaviors are expressed.

Alternative perspectives and critiques

In all of the above examples that are argued to support the 'nurture kinship' perspective, alternative interpretations may be equally persuasive or more insightful. In many such small communities, which may be isolated (such as the ones of the Chuuk of Micronesia), the relatedness between members of a group is to be assumed. This may also be the case for an amerindian tribe, (such as the Hoti of Guyana, and the Bahian Amerindians). So it can be argued that those bonds of affection are what naturally link parents to children exactly because of their existing relatedness.

In many of these cases, even if 'symbolic valuation' (and explicit recognition) of blood is not present, most of the time nurturing may anyway be concentrated between (blood) siblings (e.g. the Piro of Amazonia). In the case of the Temanambondro of Madagascar, as in the above case of the Navajo, nurturing is a complementary element of kin-familial and social life and not an antithesis of it. Likewise, in the Bahain Amerindian (Brazil) case of fostering, the recognition of their legitimate parents does not cease to be made, and it is not rejected. Such attachment is only seen, however, in the perspective of the offspring, rather than in the one of the progenitors.

These samples show common elements between them but also with cases in other, including Western civilizacional (where milk or breastfeeding siblings and exposed children were common for centuries), similar cases where children are not able to be nurtured by their own birth parents but are nurtured by someone else, but they do not say in themselves that parents in general are not attached, in normal conditions, to their offspring, or if that is a common situation.

These ethnographic examples correspond to a small minority of the World's population. In many cultures, people often value and even pay respect to deceased ancestors they never met, as well as a beloved parent they don't know without being his or her fault. Also, feelings towards relatives should be seen as a more personal and individual issue and particular circumstances be hold into account instead of a common whole-group mentality. Situations where the bond between kindred is broken are also the exception rather than the rule.

Overall the 'nurture kinship' perspective does not necessarily mean that human non-blood relationships such as the relationships based on nurturing are more important than the ones based on blood-kinship, since their motivation is also related to one's survival and perpetuation, or that people are necessarily bound to the culture they are inserted in, nor can it be generalized to the point of claiming all individuals always undervalue blood-kinship in the absence of nurturing. Herbert Gintis, in his review of the book Sex at Dawn, critiques the idea that human males were unconcerned with parentage, "which would make us unlike any other species I can think of".

Therefore, the nurture kinship perspective enables common ground between evolutionary biology, psychology, and socio-cultural anthropology on the topic of social bonding and cooperation, without reductionism or positing a deterministic role to genes or genetic relatedness in the mechanisms through which social behaviors are expressed.

See also
 Attachment theory
 Fictive kinship
 Human inclusive fitness
 Inclusive fitness
 Kin recognition
 Kin selection
 Kinship
 Milk kinship
 Rada (fiqh)
 Social bonding and nurture kinship

Notes

Kinship and descent